Thomas A. Hopkins (born January 13, 1960) is a former American football offensive tackle who played in the National Football League for one season. He played college football at Alabama A&M.

Professional career
Hopkins was selected by the Boston Breakers in the 17th round of the 1983 USFL Draft, but did not play for the team.

Hopkins was later selected by the Cleveland Browns in the tenth round of the 1983 NFL Draft. Hopkins played two games for the Browns in the 1983 season.

References

External links
 Pro Football Archives bio

1960 births
Living people
American football offensive tackles
Alabama A&M Bulldogs football players
Cleveland Browns players
People from Butler, Alabama
Players of American football from Alabama